Brian Dunn (born April 5,1974) was the 1992 juniors US Open champion for tennis. That same year losing in the final round of the Junior Wimbledon, and Australian Open. However, he retired at a young age due to knee injuries.

The 6 feet, 7 inch Dunn reached a high ATP ranking of world No. 153. A native of Tampa, Florida, he resided in Bradenton while on the tour. He reached the second round of the (senior) 1992 US Open in his only grand slam event main draw appearance. Dunn played in a handful of grand prix events during 1992 through 1995, finishing with a career record of 4 wins, 12 losses.  He reached one final in challenger events, the Naples Challenger in May, 1994.  He played his final tour event in September 1996.

Dunn was also the 14-and-under singles champion at Les Petits As in 1988.

Junior Grand Slam finals

Singles: 3 (1 title, 2 runner-ups)

ATP Challenger and ITF Futures Finals

Singles: 1 (0–1)

Doubles: 1 (1–0)

Performance timeline

Singles

References

External links
 
 

1974 births
Living people
American male tennis players
Sportspeople from Bradenton, Florida
Tennis players from Tampa, Florida
US Open (tennis) junior champions
Grand Slam (tennis) champions in boys' singles